Silverstone Air Services Limited, trading as Silverstone Air, was a privately owned airline in Kenya, licensed by the Kenya Civil Aviation Authority with an air operator's certificate.

Location
The headquarters of Silverstone Air were located at on the ground floor of Aerlink House, at Wilson Airport, in the south-western part of Nairobi, the capital and largest city of Kenya. The geographical coordinates of the airline's headquarters are:1°19'23.0"S, 36°48'30.0"E (Latitude:-1.323056; Longitude:36.808333).

History
Silverstone Air was owned and operated by Kenyans. The airline was founded in 2017. It operated scheduled, charter and cargo flights inside Kenya. Scheduled flights were available to Kisumu, Mombasa, Lamu, Eldoret, Malindi, Lodwar, Ukunda.

On 12 November 2019 the airline suspended all flights due to non-compliance problems.

Destinations
From its hub in Nairobi Wilson Airport, the company operated scheduled services to destinations within Kenya. The airline also operated direct return flights to Mombasa from Kisumu International Airport.

Fleet
As of September 2019, Silverstone Air operated the following aircraft:

Incidents and accidents
In September 2020, a Silverstone Air Fokker 50 cargo plane crashed in Mogadishu, Somalia during landing. No fatalities were recorded. On 12 October 2019, a Silverstone Air Fokker 50 aircraft bound for Mombasa Airport, with continuing service to Lamu Airport, veered off the runway at Wilson Airport in Nairobi. While attempting to take off, with a total of 55 people on board, 50 passengers and five crew members, the aircraft veered off the runway and crashed through the fence, coming to rest in the brush. Nine people on board were injured and the aircraft was damaged.

On 28 October 2019, a Dash 8-300, registration 5Y-BWG, operated by Silverstone Air, lost its rear-right wheel assembly on take-off from Lodwar Airport, with four passengers and five crew members on board. Originally destined for Wilson Airport in Nairobi, the flight was diverted to Eldoret International Airport, where it made a safe emergency landing. The detached wheel assembly was recovered by the public outside Lodwar Airport, in Turkana County.

As a result of a safety audit by the Kenya Civil Aviation Authority following these two accidents, the airline was ordered on 12 November 2019 by the Kenyan Civil Aviation Authority to suspend operations with the Dash 8 for seven days.

On 19 September, a Fokker 50 (5Y-MHT) after take-off at Mogadishu, the aircraft returned to the Aden Adde International Airport in Mogadishu for an emergency landing. During that landing, the aircraft veered off the runway and impacted a perimeter wall.

See also

 Airlines of Africa 
 List of airlines of Kenya

References

External links
 Silverstone Air

Defunct airlines of Kenya
Airlines established in 2017
Airlines disestablished in 2019
Nairobi
2019 disestablishments in Kenya
Kenyan companies established in 2017